Mád ( Made) is a village in Borsod-Abaúj-Zemplén County in northeastern Hungary.

The former Jewish synagogue in Mád was restored between 2000 and 2004 with aid from the World Monuments Fund.

References

Populated places in Borsod-Abaúj-Zemplén County